St. Peter and Paul-Collegiate in Kruszwica - granite and sandstone romanesque Roman Catholic church with transept, presbytery and apse founded in 1120.

Inowrocław County
Kruszwica